Britain's Most Historic Towns is a British television history programme presented by Alice Roberts that began airing on Channel 4 in 2018. A second and third series were commissioned.

History
Britain's Most Historic Towns is a history TV programme first aired as a series of six episodes beginning 7 April 2018. The premise of each episode was that presenter Professor Alice Roberts and contributor Dr Ben Robinson would provide evidence and stories to back up that week's featured town's claim to be the most historic town from some period in British history.

A second series started on Channel 4 on 18 May 2019 with an episode based on wartime Dover. Filming for the third series began in February 2020, but had to be paused from mid-March due to the national travel restrictions arising from the COVID-19 pandemic.

List of episodes

Series 1

Series 2

Series 3

∗ Not in BARB top 20 viewing figures

References

External links
 

2018 British television series debuts
2020 British television series endings
2010s British documentary television series
2020s British documentary television series
Channel 4 documentary series
English-language television shows
Archaeology of the United Kingdom
Television series by Banijay